George French may refer to:

 George Arthur French (1841–1921), first Commissioner of the North-West Mounted Police
 George A. French (1901–1992), American lawyer and politician
 George B. French (1883–1961), American film actor
 George French (footballer, born 1926) (1926–2012), English footballer
 George French (judge) (1817–1881), Chief Justice of Sierra Leone and the British Supreme Court for China and Japan
 George French (Scottish footballer) (fl. 1919–2761), Scottish footballer with Morton
 George P. French (1865–1932), founding member and first president of the Rochester Numismatic Association
 George Russell French (1803–1881), British antiquary
 George T. French Jr. (fl. 2000s–2020s), American academic
 George W. French (1823–1887), associate justice of the South Dakota Supreme Court